Famke Beumer Janssen (born ) is a Dutch actress. She played Xenia Onatopp in GoldenEye (1995), Jean Grey / Phoenix in the X-Men film series (2000–2014), and Lenore Mills in the Taken film trilogy (2008–2014). In 2008, she was appointed a Goodwill Ambassador for Integrity by the United Nations. She made her directorial debut with Bringing Up Bobby in 2011. She is also known for her roles in the Netflix original series Hemlock Grove (2013–2015), FX's Nip/Tuck (2003–2010), and ABC's How to Get Away with Murder (2014–2020). Janssen starred in the 2017 NBC crime thriller The Blacklist: Redemption.

Early life and education 
Famke Beumer Janssen was born  in Amstelveen, the Netherlands. She has two sisters, director Antoinette Beumer and actress Marjolein Beumer, both of whom changed their surnames to Beumer after their parents divorced.

In addition to her native Dutch, Janssen speaks English and French. She learned German, but has not kept up with it. Following her high school graduation, Janssen studied economics for a year at the University of Amsterdam, which she later called "the stupidest idea I ever had." In the early 1990s, she enrolled at Columbia University's School of General Studies to study creative writing and literature.

Career

Modelling and early 1990s 
In 1984, Janssen moved to the United States to begin her professional career as a fashion model. She signed with Elite Model Management and worked for Yves Saint Laurent, Giorgio Armani, Chanel, and Victoria's Secret. She starred in a 1988 commercial for the perfume Exclamation by Coty, Inc. Her looks have been compared to 1940s movie stars like Hedy Lamarr.

After retiring from modelling in the early 1990s, Janssen had guest roles on several television series, including a starring role in the 1992 Star Trek: The Next Generation episode "The Perfect Mate", as empathic metamorph Kamala, opposite Patrick Stewart, with whom she later starred in the X-Men film series. That same year, Janssen was offered the role of Jadzia Dax in Star Trek: Deep Space Nine, but turned it down to pursue film roles. Her first film role was alongside Jeff Goldblum in the 1992 crime drama film Fathers & Sons.

1990s 

In 1995, Janssen appeared in Pierce Brosnan's debut James Bond film, GoldenEye, as femme fatale Xenia Onatopp. She appeared in Lord of Illusions with Scott Bakula. In an attempt to fight against typecasting after her Bond girl performance, Janssen began seeking out more intriguing support roles, appearing in John Irvin's City of Industry, Woody Allen's Celebrity, Robert Altman's The Gingerbread Man, and Ted Demme's Monument Ave. Denis Leary, her co-star in Monument Ave., was impressed by how easily she blended in, initially not recognizing her, as she was already in character. In the late 1990s, she appeared in The Faculty, Rounders, Deep Rising, and House on Haunted Hill.

X-Men films 
In 2000, Janssen played superhero Dr. Jean Grey in the 20th Century Fox film X-Men. She later reprised the role in the 2003 sequel, X2, where her character shows signs of increasing powers, but at the end of the film, she is presumably killed. Janssen returns as Jean, whose death in X2 awoke her dark alternate personality, Phoenix, in X-Men: The Last Stand (2006). For that role, she won a Saturn Award for Best Supporting Actress. She returned as Jean in the 2013 film The Wolverine as a hallucination of Wolverine, followed by a brief cameo for X-Men: Days of Future Past (2014).

2002–present 
In 2002, Janssen landed the role of villainess Serleena in Men in Black II, but had to abandon the film due to a death in her family and was replaced by Lara Flynn Boyle. Janssen had a prominent role in the second season of the TV series Nip/Tuck, as the seductive and manipulative life coach Ava Moore, which earned her Hollywood Life's Breakthrough Artist of the Year Award. She reprised her role in the final two episodes of the series.

In 2007, she starred in Turn the River, for which she was awarded the Special Recognition Best Actress Award at the Hamptons International Film Festival. The following year, she starred in Luc Besson's Taken. Janssen continued to work in television, appearing in TV pilots for NBC's police drama Winters and Showtime's The Farm, a spinoff of The L Word set in a women's prison. Both pilots were rejected by their networks. Janssen provided the Dutch language narration for the Studio Tram Tour at all Disney theme parks.

In 2011, Janssen made her directorial debut with the drama Bringing Up Bobby. She wrote the screenplay to the film, which stars Milla Jovovich, Bill Pullman, and Marcia Cross. She reprised her role as Lenore Mills in Taken 2 (2012) and Taken 3 (2014). She starred as the main villain Muriel in Hansel & Gretel: Witch Hunters (2013).

Janssen has starred in the Netflix original horror thriller television series Hemlock Grove since 2013, wherein she plays the role of family matriarch Olivia Godfrey. Janssen had a recurring role in the ABC crime thriller television series How To Get Away With Murder, appearing in 10 episodes throughout the series, beginning her role in season two of the show and concluding it in the series finale.

Janssen was cast in a starring role in the NBC crime thriller, The Blacklist: Redemption, a spin-off of the NBC series The Blacklist, in March 2016; it was picked up to series in May 2016. In 2019, she served as a juror for the Tribeca Film Festival. Also in 2019, Janssen joined Jeffrey Dean Morgan in The Postcard Killings, which was released in 2020. In 2021, Janssen will star in the Christian romantic drama film Redeeming Love and the upcoming action-thriller Dangerous.

In a March 2021 interview, she revealed to Forbes some details about her involvement with the live action adaptation of Saint Seiya, a popular anime and manga. Janssen declared that filming was supposed to take place in Europe the previous year, but production had been postponed twice due to the Coronavirus pandemic. She also hinted that she will play one of the main characters, but did not specify their name.

Personal life and activism 
In 1995, Janssen married writer and director Kip Williams, son of architect Tod Williams. They divorced in 2000. She has stated that she does not want to have children.

Janssen appeared with her dog, Licorice, a brindle Boston Terrier, in a 2007 PETA campaign to raise awareness for animal rights. The campaign used the slogan "Be an Angel for Animals." On 28 January 2008, she was appointed a Goodwill Ambassador for Integrity for the United Nations Office on Drugs and Crime at a United Nations anticorruption conference held in Nusa Dua, Bali.

In 2016, Janssen showed frustration in not being cast in the new X-Men movie X-Men: Apocalypse, saying Hollywood was sexist toward older women. She said, "Women, it's interesting because they're replaced, and the older versions are never to be seen again... whereas the men are allowed to be both ages."

Filmography

Film

Television

As director 

 Bringing Up Bobby (2011), as director, producer, writer

Awards and nominations

References

External links 

 
 
 
 

Age controversies
1960s births
Living people
20th-century Dutch actresses
21st-century Dutch actresses
HIV/AIDS activists
Dutch expatriates in the United States
Dutch female models
Dutch film actresses
Dutch television actresses
Dutch people of Frisian descent
People from Amstelveen
Columbia University School of General Studies alumni